Psychotria raivavaensis is a species of plant in the family Rubiaceae. It is endemic to French Polynesia.

References

Flora of French Polynesia
raivavaensis
Least concern plants
Taxonomy articles created by Polbot